Cité-centre is an administrative term for the city center of Geneva, Switzerland.

Geography 
Part of the administrative sector of Genève-Cité, the Cité-centre district is divided into four main parts:
 the upper town or Cité: located on the hill overlooking Geneva and dominated by the silhouette of Saint-Pierre cathedral
 the lower town: the district of Rues basse and Rive which regroup the main shopping streets (rue de la Confédération, rue du Marché, rue de la Croix-d'Or, rue de Rive, rue du Rhône, etc.) as well as some of the oldest squares in the city (Molard, Fusterie and Longemalle)
 the districts of Tranchées and Saint-Léger located at the site of the ancient eastern fortifications of Geneva
 Hollande's banking district and the one surrounding Parc des Bastions

The old town of Geneva, which constituted the medieval fortified city, is made up of Cité-centre and the district of Saint-Gervais. Cité-center occupies the left bank of the Rhône, and Saint-Gervais the right bank.

References

Geography of Geneva